The West Indies cricket team toured India in December 2019 to play three One Day Internationals (ODIs) and three Twenty20 International (T20I) matches. In November 2019, the Board of Control for Cricket in India (BCCI) swapped the venues for the first and third T20I matches. Ahead of the tour, Chris Gayle confirmed that he would not be playing in the ODIs for the West Indies, after he announced he would be taking a break from cricket.

For the first time in international cricket, the International Cricket Council (ICC) announced the use of technology to monitor front-foot no-balls for all matches during the tour. The third umpire called the front-foot no-balls, communicating this with the on-field umpires. It was used as a trial to see if it can be implemented further, without a detriment to the flow of the game.

India won the T20I series 2–1, winning the third and deciding match by 67 runs. India also won the ODI series 2–1, after losing the opening match. It was India's tenth-consecutive win in a bilateral ODI series against the West Indies, going back to May 2006, when the West Indies beat India 4–1 at home.

Squads

Ahead of the series, Shikhar Dhawan injured his left leg and was replaced by Sanju Samson in India's T20I squad. Dhawan was later also ruled out of India's ODI squad, and was replaced by Mayank Agarwal. Bhuvneshwar Kumar was also ruled out of India's ODI squad due to injury and was replaced by Shardul Thakur. Navdeep Saini was added to India's squad for the third and final ODI, replacing the injured Deepak Chahar.

During the West Indies' ODI series against Afghanistan in November 2019, Nicholas Pooran was found guilty of ball tampering. He was banned for four T20I matches, therefore missing the three T20I matches against Afghanistan and the first T20I against India.

T20I series

1st T20I

2nd T20I

3rd T20I

ODI series

1st ODI

2nd ODI

3rd ODI

References

External links
 Series home at ESPN Cricinfo

2019 in Indian cricket
2019 in West Indian cricket
International cricket competitions in 2019–20
West Indian cricket tours of India